Ram Garh is a village of Jaranwala Tehsil in Faisalabad District, Punjab, Pakistan. It is located at 31°18'0N 73°17'0E with an altitude of 177 metres (583 feet) and is part of Union council 37 of Jaranwala with a population of 4,214.

References

Villages in Faisalabad District